The 1681 Trondheim fire started on 18 April 1681, in a building near Nidelva. Large parts of the centre of Trondheim, Sør-Trøndelag county, Norway. were destroyed, including the quay houses and Vår Frue Church. Timber merchant Thomas Hammond perished during the fire.

After the fire incident, a new city plan of Trondheim was developed by Johan Caspar von Cicignon, on the initiative of the King Christian V.

References

1681 fires 
Tronheim Fire, 1681
Fires in Norway
History of Trondheim
1681 disasters in Europe